Polish National Home may refer to:

Polish National Home (Hartford, Connecticut), listed on the National Register of Historic Places in Hartford County, Connecticut
Polish National Home (Chicopee, Massachusetts), listed on the National Register of Historic Places in Hampden County, Massachusetts